Tallac Records is the label created in 2004 by the French rapper Booba. It is licensed by the record label Barclay Records, a subsidiary of Universal Music Group. Associated labels include  92i Records (since 2015 and many times as an affiliate of AZ/Capitol, Universal, Tallac Records), 7 Corp (since 2018, launched by Booba and managed by Anne Cibron & Capitol Records) and La Piraterie Music (since October 2020, launched by Booba with distribution with Because Music).

Artists
with 92i
The artists signed to the label include:
 Booba 
 SDM
 Green Montana
 Bilton
 Elia
 JSX
 Sicario
 Lestin
 Dixon 
 KRN
 Dala

with 7 Corp
 Dixon
 Bramsito
 Lestin              
 KRN

Artistes Piraterie Musicː
JSX 
Dala

Former artists
 Nessbeal (2004-2005)
 Sir Doum's (2004-2005)
 Issaka (2004-2006)
 Bram's (2004-2011)
 Mala (2004-2014)
 Djé (2007-2013)
 40000 Gang (2014-2015)
 Alox (2014-2015)
 Elh Kmer (2014-2015)
 Vesti (2014-2015)
 Braki (2014-2015)
 Darki (2014-2018)
 Benash (2014-2020)
 Shay (2014-2017)
 Damso (2016-2018)
 Siboy (2015-2020)
 Nadjee (2019-2020)

Associations
Chris Macari, a music video director and producer, closely cooperates with the label. 
Therapy, record producer duo and made up of two individuals known as 2031 and 2093. They operate Therapy Music, a sub-label affiliated with Tallac Records.

The company also has its line of jewelry in association with and produced by Tony Bling, a well-known trademark.

French record labels
Record labels established in 2004